Joshua Olson (born August 21, 1979) is a former American rifle shooter. He competed at the 2012 Paralympics and placed 12th in the mixed 50 m rifle prone SH1 event.

Biography

Early life and Paralympics
Olson became a Paralympian after losing his leg to a rocket-propelled grenade in Iraq War in 2003. In June 2005, he was assigned as a marksman to Fort Benning, where practiced shotgun shooting. He said that in his first tryout outside he hit 49 out of 50. In 2009 he won silver medals at the Oceania Games and Hessian Trophy and gold medals at the French Grand Prix and Alicante Cup. He qualified for the 2012 Paralympics by winning a gold and a silver medal at an IPC Approved Competition in 2011.

Prosthesis development
Besides shooting Olson helped develop a prosthesis for wounded soldiers. In late 2004, he met a Prosthetics and Associates employee in Orlando, Florida; together they drew a design on a piece of napkin. As soon as he came back to Walter Reed Army Medical Center the officials liked the new prosthesis on him so much that they started sending copies to wounded soldiers in Florida.

References

1979 births
Sportspeople from Spokane, Washington
Paralympic shooters of the United States
Shooters at the 2012 Summer Paralympics
Living people